Attractio is a single player game by Mexican developers GameCoder Studios, Renderfarm Studios and publisher Bandai Namco Entertainment. Attractio takes place in the Entertainment Space Station (ESS), an artificial satellite orbiting Mars where players will solve deadly physics-based puzzles using gadgets that manipulate gravity. This futuristic puzzle platformer draws its gameplay inspiration from games like Portal, while also being inspired by futuristic stories like those similar to Running Man.

Synopsis 
The story is set in the future and follows three characters trying to find a better life for themselves. They do this by competing in this televised game of knowledge, skill, and physical ability that will reward successful contestants with grand prizes, but only death for those that fail during the trials. Each character features their own unique puzzles with gravity altering mechanics. Mia, a police woman from Mars, will utilize gravity boots to swap her personal gravity to traverse the puzzles and mazes. Keir gets a gravity gun that he can use to manipulate the gravity of specific boxes to help him reach distant areas or activate switches from afar. And... Dalek, his puzzles focused on manipulation of crates and their gravity using switches, force fields, and gravity crates.

Gameplay 
Although the game has gone through visual improvements, there hasn't been any announcements suggesting the gameplay will change from its early-access version days:In Attractio each object has its own gravity direction, which can be changed by the player. The interaction between objects with different gravity directions presents various possibilities. Thus, the player can solve each puzzle across the game in many different ways. Some examples of these possibilities are: 
 Creating a zero gravity object by colliding two objects of the same weight and opposite gravity direction. 
 Softening the character's landing with a box with gravity direction perpendicular to a wall. This happens due to the friction between the wall and the box. 
 Gravity-Boxes: A special kind of box that, when touched by another box, flips the second box's gravity direction. This is useful to automate some mechanics in the game and perform simultaneous tasks.
The player will play with three different characters, each one with different abilities, adding variety to the puzzles. Some puzzles can be solved by a contestant alone, but for some others the player will need to switch between the contestants.While some puzzle games make it obvious about the defined solution for your puzzle, Attractio instead expands on this idea and allows creativity to flourish, giving you subtle clues on the multiple ways to solve each puzzle.

Development 
As an indie game, it was first announced for Steam Greenlight in 2013, and successfully "Greenlit" the following year. Shortly after, before the developers announced the game was now being published (after improvements) by Bandai Namco Entertainment, an early access of Attractio, supporting Windows and already with plans for the Oculus Rift, was available: "GameCoder Studios has announced that its indie first-person puzzle title, Attractio, will be launching via early access on Thursday, 20th March."

Music 

The music of attractio was made by composer Novelli Jurado, in this compositions he mixed electronic music with classical and tribal textures gathering a variety range of emotions.  With this work he is the first latinamerican composer whose work was distributed worldwide by Japanese renown company Bandai-Namco for Sony PlayStation 4, PsVita and Steam.

Reception

Attractio has received mixed reviews from critics.

Thomas Ella of Hardcore Gamer gave the game a 3.5 out of 5 saying, "There’s not a lot about Attractio to pull you in from a distance. It doesn’t look, sound or even feel that great. Its story is obvious and uninteresting. Everything about it screams “knockoff” like a “ROLAX” watch, but don't be fooled: if you're a fiend for devious puzzles, Attractio is the real deal." Mitchell Saltzman from The Escapist rated the game a 3/5 saying, "Die-hard puzzle fans that are always on the lookout for ways to give their brain a workout may want to give Attractio a shot. Others may not be willing to look past the game's glaring surface flaws."

References

External links 
 

2016 video games
PlayStation 4 games
PlayStation Vita games
Windows games
MacOS games
Indie video games
Linux games
Puzzle video games
First-person shooters
Video games developed in Mexico